The Sami Church Council (n.sa. Sámi girkoráđđi, l.sa. Sáme girkoráde, s.sa. Saemien gærhkoeraerie) is the organ of the Church of Norway responsible for Sami church life. It answers to the General Synod of the Church of Norway.

Background
The history of the Sami people is one of marginalisation and Norwegianization – the government policy of forced assimilation of the Sami into Norwegian society. Christian missions among the Sami people go back to the Middle Ages, but from 1700 the Protestant and pietistic mission among the Sami, together with state colonialism, brought lasting changes to the Sami society (as well as religion). From around 1850 a very rough assimilation policy held the Sami people in a firm grip until 1980. This period may be referred to as the Dark Ages of the Sami people. This assimilation policy permeated the public officials, schools and the Church of Norway. In parts of Sápmi the Sami culture and language was eradicated during this period.

Throughout the nineteen-eighties, an increasing awareness of the rights of the indigenous peoples became visible both in the Norwegian and the Sami society. The awakening had begun for the Sami people in the beginning of the 20th century and during the so-called Alta controversy it became a hot topic among the Norwegian politicians as well. In 1989 the Sami people were granted their own parliament, the Sámediggi.

In 1992 the General Synod in the Church of Norway decided to establish an organ to oversee and work for the Sami church life. In 1997 the General Synod acknowledged its role in the assimilation process and declared it would make good of its mistakes.

Organisation 
The council has seven members. One member is to be a bishop appointed by the Bishops’ Conference, and one appointed by the Sami Parliament. The General Synod elects five other members, among these there is to be a representative from some of the Sami languages in Norway (Southern Sami, Lule Sami and Northern Sami). The leader of the council is elected by the General Synod.

A process to move the Secretariat is currently in motion. The current leader of the Sami Church Council is Tore Johnsen and the Secretary General is Rávdná Turi Henriksen (temporary constituted).

Main aims of the council
According to the statutes of the Sami Church Council (KM 12/92) the main aims are:
 to further, protect and coordinate Sami church life in the Church of Norway
 to respond to issues that according to the council is of relevance to Sami church life or indigenous people
 to further knowledge of particular values that Sami church life and the heritage of Sami Christianity represents for the Church as a whole, and to work with issues the church needs to related to the Sami culture, tradition and history
 to contribute to the strengthening of the culture and language of the Sami population, and to further knowledge and commitment to the role of the Sami people in the Church of Norway.
 to care for relations with churches that has Sami congregations in Scandinavia and the Kola Peninsula, and to further work and coordination of issues that are of common interest of the Sami Christians
 to oversee the work with indigenous question, together with the Council on Ecumenical and International Relations on behalf of the Church of Norway.

Leaders
Nils Jernsletten (He was elected in 1992  as its first leader.)

See also
 Church of Norway
 Sami religion
 Sami history

References

External links 
Church of Norway web-site

Church of Norway
Sámi church life
Sámi in Norway
Sámi associations
Indigenous organisations in Norway